The White Rod, White Wand, Rod of Inauguration, or Wand of Sovereignty, in the Irish language variously called the slat na ríghe (rod of kingship) and slat tighearnais (rod of lordship), was the primary symbol of a Gaelic king or lord's legitimate authority and the principal prop used in his inauguration ceremony. First documented in the 12th century Life of Máedóc of Ferns, but assumed to have been used long before then, it is last documented in Ireland in the early 17th century. In Scotland the rod was used into the 13th century for the inauguration of its last Gaelic-speaking kings, and for the Norse-Gaelic Lords of the Isles into the 15th.

While the reception of the rod was in origin a Gaelic cultural feature, following the Viking and Norman invasion of Ireland some foreign families became significantly Gaelicised. A notable example were the great Hiberno-Norman De Burgh magnates styled Mac William Íochtar, who had become completely Gaelicised, ruled over their followers as Irish clan chiefs, and received the White Rod.

Qualities and symbolism
The rod was required to be both white and straight, with the colour representing purity and the straightness of justice, according to the account given by Geoffrey Keating.

Even after the collapse of all other institutions of Gaelic Ireland, the Chief Poet of a district, who presided well into 18th-century Munster over the district's Cúirt, a poetic court similar to the Welsh Eisteddfod, would receive a Staff of Office, which would later be handed down to his successor.

Ceremony
Although the meaning and purpose were always the same, the particulars of the ceremony appear to have varied across the Gaelic world. Most notably, who presented the new lord or king with the rod depended on the history and traditions of each kingdom.

A note to the pedigree of the O'Mahonys at Lambeth, written by Sir George Carew, circa 1600/3:

Parliament of Scotland
Prior to the Union with England in 1707, there was a Gentleman Usher of the White Rod in the Estates of Parliament in Edinburgh, who had a similar role to the Gentleman Usher of the Black Rod in the Parliaments of England, the Kingdom of Great Britain and then the United Kingdom.

The Heritable Usher of the White Rod is the only example of an office of the Crown becoming incorporated as a company. The Walker Trust Act, 1877, incorporated the office into the Walker Trustees, entitling the trustees to charge dues from anyone receiving an honour from the Crown. In 1908 the Society of Knights Bachelor was formed to contest this right, but a Court of Session case the following year confirmed the right of the Walker Trustees to charge recipients of honours. However, the Society of Knights Bachelor won an appeal to the House of Lords in 1911.

The Lord Bishop of Edinburgh, as ex officio chair of the Walker Trustees, is the Heritable Usher of the White Rod. The current holder is The Rt Rev. Dr John A. Armes, Bishop of Edinburgh, but the role carries no duties.

See also
 Gaelic nobility of Ireland
 Tullyhogue Fort
 Royal sites of Ireland
 Lord Great Chamberlain
 Lord High Steward of Ireland
 Peerage

References

Sources

 Bannerman, John, "The King's Poet and the Inauguration of Alexander III", in The Scottish Historical Review Vol. 68, No. 186, Part 2 (Oct. 1989): 120–149.
 Bannerman, John, "The Residence of the King's Poet", in Scottish Gaelic Studies XVII (1996): 24–35.
 Book of Clanranald, ed. & tr. Alexander Cameron, in Reliquiæ Celticæ. Vol. II. Inverness. 1894. pp. 138–309.
 Dillon, Myles, "The consecration of Irish kings", in Celtica 10 (1973): 1–8.
 FitzPatrick, Elizabeth, "An Tulach Tinóil"
 FitzPatrick, Elizabeth, Royal Inauguration in Gaelic Ireland c. 1100–1600: A Cultural Landscape Study. Boydell Press. 2004.
 Green, Alice Stopford, The Making of Ireland and its Undoing: 1200–1600. London: Macmillan. 1908.
 Geoffrey Keating, Foras Feasa ar Éirinn (circa 1634), ed. & tr. David Comyn and Patrick S. Dinneen (1902–1914). The History of Ireland by Geoffrey Keating. Irish Texts Society. edition and translation available from CELT.
 Kingston, Simon, Ulster and the Isles in the Fifteenth Century: the Lordship of the Clann Domhnaill of Antrim. Dublin: Four Courts Press. 2004.
 Mitchel, John, The Life and Times of Aodh O'Neill, Prince of Ulster. New York: Excelsior Catholic Publishing House. 1879.
 Nicholls, K. W., Gaelic and Gaelicized Ireland in the Middle Ages. Dublin: Lilliput Press. 2nd edition, 2003.
 O'Donovan, John (ed.), and Duald Mac Firbis, The Genealogies, Tribes, and Customs of Hy-Fiachrach. Dublin: Irish Archaeological Society. 1844. pp. 425–452.

Irish nobility
Monarchy in medieval Ireland
Gaelic nobility of Ireland
Feudalism in Scotland